Eleanor Rose "Ella" Edmondson (born 22 January 1986) is an English singer-songwriter. Her primary instrument is the guitar although she can also play the piano.

Early life
Eleanor Rose Edmondson was born on 22 January 1986 in Hammersmith, London. She is the eldest of three daughters of comedians Ade Edmondson and Jennifer Saunders. She has two younger sisters, Beatrice and Freya. The majority of Edmondson's childhood was spent in Richmond, Surrey before her family relocated to Devon. She attended Exeter School where she wrote songs as part of her music GCSE.

Career
Edmondson became a fan of death metal because it was the only music that her father did not like. She went through a goth phase as a teenager and became a satanist. She worked as a snowboarding instructor in Canada, a barmaid and a painter and decorator before deciding to focus on music full-time after being encouraged by her father. She "got the bug" after supporting Jools Holland at the Plymouth Pavilions.

She received her first guitar as a Christmas present from her father and taught herself to play by copying him. Her first gig was at 16 supporting Thousand Natural Shocks in Exeter. She made an appearance in an episode of her mother's sitcom Jam and Jerusalem in 2006 performing "Breathe". In 2007, she released her first EP, Blame Amy, and appeared on the compilation Folk Rising. Her debut album, Hold Your Horses, was released on 16 February 2009, on her father's Monsoon record label.

In 2010, she toured as the supporting act to her father's punk-inspired folk act The Bad Shepherds.

Personal life
Edmondson married Dan Furlong on 30 September 2010 and together they have three children.

References

External links
Official Site

1986 births
Living people
21st-century British guitarists
21st-century English singers
21st-century English women singers
English women singer-songwriters
English pop singers
English women guitarists
English guitarists
People educated at Exeter School
Musicians from Exeter
People from Richmond, London
21st-century women guitarists